Peter Kidner Stagg (born 22 November 1941) is a former Scottish international rugby union player and the son of Sir James Stagg, the senior meteorologist adviser for Operation Overlord, the D-Day landings in Normandy.
Peter Stagg was capped twenty-eight times as a lock for Scotland between 1965 and 1970, including one cap as a replacement.

Stagg was selected for the 1968 British Lions tour to South Africa and played in three of the four internationals against .

He played club rugby for Sale and was also invited to play with the Anti-Assassins rugby team, a side based in Cumbria in the north of England that played charity and friendly matches at home and abroad.

In 1975 he was living in Zambia and playing rugby for the Ndola Wanderers RFC when the East African touring side the Tuskers visited. He played for Zambia in their first ever international on 31 August 1975 at Kitwe.

References

External links
 

1941 births
Living people
British & Irish Lions rugby union players from Scotland
British expatriates in Zambia
Rugby union locks
Rugby union players from Twickenham
Scotland international rugby union players
Scottish rugby union players
Zambian rugby union players